Kwante Lavon Hampton (born December 11, 1963) is a former American football wide receiver who played one season in the National Football League (NFL) for the Atlanta Falcons. Hampton also spent time with the New York Jets.

Early life and education
Hampton was born on December 11, 1963, in Los Angeles, California. He attended Van Nuys High School, recording 58 receptions for 987 yards and 13 touchdowns in 1980, and earning second-team all-valley honors by The Los Angeles Times. His coach said, "He will catch anything that touches his hands." Hampton committed to the University of Oregon in 1982, joining former Van Nuys teammate Mike Owens. He earned varsity letters in his first two years with the team, before transferring to Long Beach State University in 1984. He graduated following the 1986 season.

Professional career
After going unselected in the 1987 NFL Draft, Hampton was signed by the Los Angeles Rams as an undrafted free agent. He was released at the final roster cuts in September.

Hampton was signed by the Atlanta Falcons later in the season, as a replacement player during the Players Association strike. He appeared in one game with the team before being released.

Hampton was signed by the New York Jets in May , but did not make their final roster.

Notes

References

1963 births
Living people
Players of American football from Los Angeles
American football wide receivers
Oregon Ducks football players
Long Beach State 49ers football players
Los Angeles Rams players
Atlanta Falcons players
New York Jets players
National Football League replacement players